Sorkheban or Sorkhban may refer to:
 Sorkheban-e Olya
 Sorkheban-e Sofla